Steep Island, also known as Steep Head, is a 21.6 ha island in Bass Strait in south-eastern Australia. It is part of Tasmania’s Hunter Island Group and lies between north-west Tasmania and King Island. It was once used for grazing sheep but title has been transferred to the Tasmanian Aboriginal community; with an estimated 250,000 shearwater burrows present, it is principally used for muttonbirding.

Fauna
The island forms part of the Hunter Island Group Important Bird Area.  Breeding seabirds and shorebirds include little penguin, short-tailed shearwater, common diving-petrel, Pacific gull, silver gull, sooty oystercatcher and black-faced cormorant. Tiger snakes have been introduced to the island and pose a threat to breeding seabirds.

References

North West Tasmania
Important Bird Areas of Tasmania
Private islands of Tasmania
Islands of Bass Strait